Manuel Martínez (born 6 April 1939) is a Spanish fencer. He competed in the individual and team épée events at the 1960 Summer Olympics.

References

External links
 

1939 births
Living people
Spanish male épée fencers
Olympic fencers of Spain
Fencers at the 1960 Summer Olympics